Bouconville-sur-Madt is a commune in the Meuse department in Grand Est in northeastern France.

Geography
The village lies on the left bank of the Rupt de Mad, which flows northeast through the eastern part of the commune.

Population

References

See also
Communes of the Meuse department
Parc naturel régional de Lorraine

Communes of Meuse (department)